Fletcher Smith (born 1 March 1995) is a New Zealand rugby union player who currently plays as a first five-eighth for  in New Zealand's domestic Mitre 10 Cup and the Hurricanes in Super Rugby. He is Māori of Ngāti Kahungunu descent.

Early career

Raised in Nelson on New Zealand's South Island, Smith initially attended Nelson College in his hometown before finishing off his schooling at Christchurch Boys' High School, playing first XV rugby for them and wearing the same number 10 jersey that Dan Carter, Andrew Mehrtens and Aaron Mauger had worn before him.  After graduating high school, he headed south to Dunedin to study commerce at the University of Otago and played local club rugby for the university's team during his time there.

Senior career

Smith got his senior career under way in 2015, turning out 11 times for Otago in the ITM Cup Championship and helping them to a third-place finish.

Super Rugby

Smith earned a short-term contract with the Highlanders towards the end of the 2016 season and made two substitute appearances in which he kicked one conversion.   He was subsequently promoted to the franchise's full squad for the 2017 Super Rugby season.

Super Rugby statistics

References

External links
 

1995 births
Living people
New Zealand rugby union players
Rugby union fly-halves
Highlanders (rugby union) players
Otago rugby union players
Ngāti Kahungunu people
People educated at Nelson College
People educated at Christchurch Boys' High School
Rugby union players from Nelson, New Zealand
Waikato rugby union players
Hurricanes (rugby union) players
Urayasu D-Rocks players
Green Rockets Tokatsu players
Lyon OU players